Manchester is an unincorporated community in Union Township, Montgomery County, in the U.S. state of Indiana.

Geography

References

Unincorporated communities in Montgomery County, Indiana
Unincorporated communities in Indiana